Khaleel Ahmed (born 5 December 1997) is an Indian international cricketer. He made his debut for Indian cricket team in September 2018.

Early life and background
Khaleel's father was Khursheed Ahmed, a nurse in a village near the small town of Tonk. His parents wanted him to become a doctor, and were reluctant to let him join a cricket academy.

Domestic career
He made his Twenty20 debut for Rajasthan in the 2016–17 Inter State Twenty-20 Tournament on 5 February 2017. Prior to his Twenty20 debut, he was part of India's squad for the 2016 Under-19 Cricket World Cup. He made his first-class debut for Rajasthan in the 2017–18 Ranji Trophy on 6 October 2017.

In January 2018, he was bought by the Sunrisers Hyderabad in the 2018 IPL auction.

He made his List A debut for Rajasthan in the 2017–18 Vijay Hazare Trophy on 5 February 2018. In February 2022, he was bought by the Delhi Capitals in the auction for the 2022 Indian Premier League tournament.

International career
In September 2018, he was named in India's One Day International (ODI) squad for the 2018 Asia Cup. He made his ODI debut for India against Hong Kong on 18 September 2018.

In October 2018, he was named in India's Twenty20 International (T20I) squad for their series against the West Indies. He made his (T20I) debut for India against the West Indies on 4 November 2018.

References

External links
 

1997 births
Living people
Indian cricketers
India One Day International cricketers
India Twenty20 International cricketers
Rajasthan cricketers
Sunrisers Hyderabad cricketers
Cricketers from Rajasthan
Indian A cricketers
Delhi Capitals cricketers